Wicomico Church is an unincorporated community in Northumberland County, in the U.S. state of Virginia.

Shalango was listed on the National Register of Historic Places in 1986.

References

Unincorporated communities in Virginia
Unincorporated communities in Northumberland County, Virginia